Wrightington Bar is a small linear village in West Lancashire, England. It is on the B5250 Appley Bridge to Eccleston road, and is in the civil parish of Wrightington.

See also

Listed buildings in Wrightington

References

Villages in Lancashire
Geography of the Borough of West Lancashire